Bolívar Airport  is an airport serving Bolívar, a town in Bolívar Partido, Buenos Aires Province, Argentina.

References

External links
 
 https://www.aopa.org/destinations/airports/M17

Airports in Buenos Aires Province